Eufrosina Dvoichenko-Markov (1901–1980) was a Russian-American  history and literary scholar identified by National Security Agency as agent Masha who worked for the New York  NKGB Rezidentura from 1943 to 1945.  Her son, Sgt. Demetrius Dvoichenko-Markov of the United States Army, is also identified by the Venona papers as a Soviet agent, but spent the rest of his life as an academician in the United States.  Masha provided Soviet intelligence with information on Romanians, Carpatho-Russians, and other exile groups in the United States. Masha also provided information on United States Department of State personnel with whom she had contact.

She died in Moscow in 1980.

Works
 Eufrosina Dvoichenko-Markov, Jefferson and the Russian Decembrists, American Slavic and East European Review, Vol. 9, No. 3. (Oct., 1950), pp. 162–168. JSTOR link
 Eufrosina Dvoichenko-Markov, The Pulkovo Observatory and Some American Astronomers of the Mid-19th Century, Isis, Vol. 43, No. 3. (Sep., 1952), pp. 243–246.  JSTOR link

References
 John Earl Haynes and Harvey Klehr, Venona: Decoding Soviet Espionage in America, Yale University Press (1999), pg. 259, 347, 449. .
 John Earl Haynes, "Cover Name, Cryptonym, CPUSA Party Name, Pseudonym, and Real Name Index. A Research Historian’s Working Reference" (revised February 2007), on the author's web site.

American spies
American spies for the Soviet Union
American people in the Venona papers
1901 births
1980 deaths